Mākoņkalns Parish is an administrative unit of Rēzekne Municipality, Latvia.

Towns, villages and settlements of Mākoņkalns parish 
  – parish administrative center

See also

References 

Parishes of Latvia
Rēzekne Municipality